Anna Rothschild is a science journalist who hosts Anna’s Science Magic Show Hooray, a video series from The Washington Post. She created Gross Science, a YouTube series from NOVA and PBS Digital Studios. She was awarded the 2016 AAAS Kavli Gold Award for Children's Science News and received the American Institute of Physics' 2012 Science Communication Award for New Media, and their 2015 award for Broadcast/New Media.

References 

Living people
Science journalists
American women journalists
Year of birth missing (living people)
21st-century American women